The Brahmin dynasty of Sindh, also known as the Chacha dynasty, were the Brahmin Hindu ruling family of the Chacha Empire.  The Brahmin dynasty were successors of the Rai dynasty. The dynasty ruled on the Indian subcontinent which originated in the region of Sindh, present-day Pakistan. Most of the information about its existence comes from the Chach Nama, a historical account of the Chach-Brahmin dynasty.

After the Chacha Empire's fall in 712, though the empire had ended, its dynasty's members administered parts of Sindh under the Umayyad Caliphate's Caliphal province of Sind. These rulers include Hullishāh and Shishah.

History

The dynasty was founded by a Brahmin named Chach of Alor after he married the widow of Rai Sahasi II, the last ruler of the Rai dynasty. His claim was further secured by the killing of Rai Sahasi II's brother.

The rule of Sindh by a Buddhist dynasty raised hope in the Umayyad Caliphate. Caliph Abd al-Malik ibn Marwan granted a large army to the governor Al-Hajjaj ibn Yusuf, but no attempt was made to annex Sindh due to the caliph's death. Under his son and successor Al-Walid I, the general Muhammad bin Qasim led Islamic invasion against Sindh in 712 where the last Hindu king of Sindh Raja Dahir died while defending his kingdom.

Rulers
The known rulers of the Brahmin dynasty are:
 Chach
 Chandar
 Dāhir ( from Alor)

Under the Umayyad Caliphate:
 Dahirsiya ( from Brahmanabad)
 Hullishāh
 Shishah

External links

|-

|-

See also
 List of monarchs of Sindh

References

History of Sindh